Johann Gebhard von Mansfeld-Vorderort, born circa 1525–30, was  Archbishop-Elector of Cologne.  He died in Frankfurt on 2 November 1562.

Career

Both Gebhard and his older brother were founding members of the Schmalkaldic League.  A dispute between Gebhard and his brother, Johann Albert, Graf von Mansfeld zu Arnstein (1522–1586) in 1546, led to mediation by Martin Luther.

In 1558, Gebhard of Mansfeld was elected archbishop of Cologne. During his tenure, the Diocese of Utrecht ceased to be a suffragan of Cologne, and the Deanery of Zyfflich was incorporated with the newly founded diocese of Roermond.

Family

As Domherr, a member of the Cathedral chapter, he lived in concubinage. He had at least one surviving child, a daughter Sybilla, who married, first, Eduard (Egbert) von Bocholtz (died after 1590); and second, Johann Eggenoy (died before 1616).

References

House of Mansfeld
Archbishop-Electors of Cologne
Canons (priests)
Dukes of Westphalia
16th-century births
1562 deaths
Year of birth uncertain